The Attorney General of the Leeward Islands was the chief law officer of the Leeward Islands.  The British crown colony of the Leeward Islands, comprising Antigua, Barbuda, the British Virgin Islands, Montserrat, Saint Kitts, Nevis, Anguilla, and (to 1940) Dominica, existed as a political entity, under various names, from 1671 to 1958, when it became part of the West Indies Federation.

Attorneys General of the Leeward Islands

British Colony, 1671–1871
 1688–1702 (or 1692) Archibald Hutcheson
 c.1713 John Yeamans
 1751– John Baker
 1754–1757 Harry Webb 
 1757–?1779 Thomas Warner  (died 1779)
 1779–?1780 William Leslie Hamilton (died 1780) 
 1781–1799 John Stanley 
 c.1810 John Burke
 c.1820 Paul Horsford
 c.1830 Charles Thomson
 c.1840 William Lee 
Federal Colony of the Leeward Islands, 1871–1956
 1870– Henry Rawlins Pipon Schooles
 1874–1877 Robert French Sheriff 
 1877–1878 Henry Spencer Berkeley (acting)
 1878–1879 Henry James Burford Hancock 
 1880–1883 Sir John Tankerville Goldney
 1883–1885 Stephen Herbert Gatty (afterwards Attorney General of Trinidad, 1886)
 1886–1889 Charles Robert Tyser  (later Chief Justice of Cyprus, 1906)
 1889–1894 Charles George Walpole 
 1894–1898 Oliver Smith
 1898–>1903  William Henry Stoker 
 1909–1917 Thomas Stafford Sidney 
 1927–1929 Harry Herbert Trusted (afterwards Attorney General of Cyprus, 1929)
 1937–1938 Cecil Edgar Allan Rawle
c.1945 Stanley Eugene Gomes, afterwards Chief Justice of Barbados, 1957
 ?–1957 Percival Cecil Lewis
 1957–1959 Wilfred Ebenezer Jacobs
 Joined West Indies Federation, 1958

References

British Leeward Islands